"Beautiful Life" is a song by Dutch DJ and record producer Armin van Buuren. It features vocals and lyrics from French singer and songwriter Cindy Alma. The song was released in the Netherlands by Armada Music as a digital download on 20 September 2013 as the third single from van Buuren's fifth studio album Intense. A French version of the song was released the next year.

Music video
A music video to accompany the release of "Beautiful Life" was first released onto YouTube on 18 August 2013. The music video was shot in New York City.

Track listing
 Digital download 
 "Beautiful Life" (radio edit) – 2:59

 CD single 
 "Beautiful Life" (radio edit) – 2:59
 "Beautiful Life" (original mix) – 6:08
 "Beautiful Life" (Mikkas remix) – 5:37
 "Beautiful Life" (Mikkas radio edit) – 3:56
 "Beautiful Life" (Protoculture remix) – 5:41
 "Beautiful Life" (Protoculture radio edit) – 3:34

 Remixes – digital download 
 "Beautiful Life" (Mikkas radio edit) – 3:56
 "Beautiful Life" (Protoculture radio edit) – 3:34
 "Beautiful Life" (Mikkas remix) – 5:37
 "Beautiful Life" (Protoculture remix) – 5:41

 French version – digital download 
 "Beautiful Life" (French original mix) – 6:10
 "Beautiful Life" (French radio edit) – 3:28

Charts

Weekly charts

Year-end charts

References 

2013 singles
Armin van Buuren songs
2013 songs
Songs written by Armin van Buuren
Armada Music singles
Songs written by Benno de Goeij
Songs written by Cyndi Almouzni